Who Gives A Crap (WGAC) is a brand of toilet paper, tissues, and paper towels founded in Australia in 2012. The company sells recycled products and donates half its profits to charity.

History 
WGAC was founded in 2012 by Simon Griffiths, Danny Alexander, and Jehan Ratnatunga. Griffiths had the idea for the company after learning that more than 2 billion people didn't have access to a toilet. WGAC launched in July 2012 with an Indiegogo crowdfunding campaign, for which Griffiths sat on a toilet in a warehouse for 50 hours, until the first $50,000 had been raised. The first deliveries were made in March 2013.

By 2020, WGAC had grown to about 100 staff, and shipped products to 36 countries, with warehouses in Australia, the United Kingdom, the United States, and the Netherlands. The company began receiving investment funding in 2021, totalling around $50 million, from investors including Mike Cannon-Brookes. WGAC is a certified B Corporation, denoting a commitment to positive social and environmental impact.

During the COVID-19 pandemic, especially in early 2020, there were numerous shortages, including of toilet paper. In March 2020, WGAC received 30-40 times the typical number of daily sales, being forced to mark their online store as 'out of stock' for a short time - a waiting list began which grew to more than 500,000 people.

Products 
WGAC toilet paper is created from recycled paper, and each roll is also individually wrapped in recycled paper. Since 2016, WGAC also sell toilet paper created from bamboo. Its toilet paper products are manufactured in China.

Charitable donations 
Half of the company's profits are donated to charities including WaterAid, WaterSHED, and Shining Hope for Communities. By 2021, WGAC had donated more than $7.8 million AUD, with $6 million USD resulting from the company's sales spike during 2020 pandemic shortages.

References

External links 

 

Toilet paper
Australian companies established in 2012
Australian brands